Johnny Jones (born ) was a professional rugby league footballer who played in the 1930s and 1940s.

Playing career

County honours
Johnny Jones won cap(s) for Yorkshire while at Wakefield Trinity.

Challenge Cup Final appearances
Johnny Jones played  in Wakefield Trinity's 13-12 victory over Wigan in the 1946 Challenge Cup Final 1945–46 season at Wembley Stadium, London on Saturday 4 May 1946, in front of a crowd of 54,730.

County Cup Final appearances
Johnny Jones played left-, i.e. number 4, in Wakefield Trinity's 2-5 defeat by Bradford Northern in the 1945 Yorkshire County Cup Final during the 1945–46 season at Thrum Hall, Halifax on Saturday 3 November 1945, and played  in the 10–0 victory over Hull F.C. in the 1946 Yorkshire County Cup Final during the 1946–47 season at Headingley Rugby Stadium, Leeds on Saturday 31 November 1946.

Club career
Johnny Jones  made his début for Wakefield Trinity during November 1937, he appears to have scored no drop-goals (or field-goals as they are currently known in Australasia), but prior to the 1974–75 season all goals, whether; conversions, penalties, or drop-goals, scored 2-points, consequently prior to this date drop-goals were often not explicitly documented, therefore '0' drop-goals may indicate drop-goals not recorded, rather than no drop-goals scored. In addition, prior to the 1949–50 season, the archaic field-goal was also still a valid means of scoring points.

References

External links
Search for "Jones" at rugbyleagueproject.org

English rugby league players
Leeds Rhinos players
Rugby league five-eighths
Wakefield Trinity players
Place of birth missing
Year of birth uncertain
Year of death missing
Yorkshire rugby league team players